Backchat with Jack Whitehall and His Dad, or simply Backchat, is a chat show that was originally broadcast on BBC Three but moved to BBC Two for its second series. The show is presented by comedian Jack Whitehall and his father Michael Whitehall, a theatrical agent who used to manage celebrities such as Colin Firth and Judi Dench. The chat show consisted of various games and quizzes presented towards celebrities who were guests on the episode, and began airing from 20 November 2013. In June 2014, Backchat returned for two summer specials in aid of the World Cup and Father's Day.

Following successful repeats of the first series on BBC Two, it was announced on 21 August 2014 that Backchat would return for a second series on BBC Two. The second series began on 5 January 2015 on BBC Two.

Following on from the second series, Backchat returned on BBC Two on 26 December 2015 for an End of Year Special.

Episodes

Series 1 (2013)

Episodes 1-4 were repeated on BBC Two throughout July 2014. Episodes 5 and 6 were shown on BBC Two in December 2014.

Summer Specials (2014)

The Summer Specials were also repeated on BBC Two but were edited to 30 minutes.

Series 2 (2015)
The second series of Backchat consisted of six episodes and was broadcast on BBC Two from Monday 5 January 2015. The episodes have been recorded throughout November and December 2014.

Backchat Looks Back (2015)
A Christmas special was recorded on 12 December 2015 at The London Studios and aired on BBC Two on 26 December 2015.

References

External links

2013 British television series debuts
2015 British television series endings
2010s British comedy television series
BBC high definition shows
BBC television comedy
BBC television talk shows
English-language television shows
Television series by Endemol
2010s British television talk shows